Richard A. Merrill (May 20, 1937 – October 26, 2017) was an American lawyer, government official, and academic administrator who served as the 7th dean of the University of Virginia School of Law and the chief counsel of the Food and Drug Administration from 1976 to 1978.

Biography 
Merrill was born on May 20, 1937 in Logan, Utah. His father, Milton Reese Merrill, was a professor of political science and top academic administrator of Utah State University, becoming Vice President and Dean of the School of Commerce.

He graduated magna cum laude and phi beta kappa from Columbia University in 1959 and attended the University of Oxford as a Rhodes Scholar, earning a B.A. in 1961. He married Elizabeth "Lissa" Merrill in 1961 and moved to New York City to attend Columbia Law School, where he received a LL.B. and became the editor-in-chief of the Columbia Law Review.

Merrill clerked for Judge Carl McGowan on the D.C. Court of Appeals following graduation before joining the law firm Covington & Burling. In 1969, he joined the faculty of the University of Virginia School of Law, becoming associate dean from 1974 to 1975.

In 1975, the outgoing chief counsel of the Food and Drug Administration, Peter Hutt, who had known Merrill from Covington, recommended Merrill as his successor. He took a sabbatical from the law school to serve as chief counsel of the FDA from 1976 to 1978.

In 1980, he was selected to be the seventh Dean of the University of Virginia School of Law, a position he held until 1988. Following his deanship, he returned to full-time teaching and research. He returned to Covington & Burling as special counsel consulting on food and drug and other regulatory matters.

In 2007, Merrill retired from the law school. He died on Thursday, October 26, 2017, in Albemarle County, Virginia from Parkinson's disease.

References 

1937 births
2007 deaths
Columbia College (New York) alumni
People from Logan, Utah
Columbia Law School alumni
American Rhodes Scholars
Food and Drug Administration people
University of Virginia School of Law faculty
American university and college faculty deans
Members of the National Academy of Medicine
People associated with Covington & Burling
20th-century American academics